The 1980 Manitoba municipal elections were held on October 22, 1980 to elect mayors, councillors, and school trustees in various communities throughout Manitoba, Canada.

Cities

Brandon

Councillors elected:

Frederick Anderson
Richard Borotsik
Richard Dyck
Gene Guentert
Audrey Martin
Ross Martin
W.G. McLeod
Mike Melnyk
Daniel Munroe
Margaret Workman

Footnotes

1980
Manitoba